Suzanna Guzmán (born in East Los Angeles, California) is an American mezzo-soprano and Emmy Award winning television host. Currently she is the host of the weekly radio program Opera at Noon and On Broadway on 105.1HD4 KMozart. She was also seen as host on television's KCET's weekly series Open Call. As a singer she has performed with international and American opera companies as a principal artist: La traviata at the Metropolitan Opera, La favorite in Montpellier, France, and Goya at the Spoleto Festival in Italy. She is known for her portrayal of the title role in Carmen for Houston Grand Opera's multimedia production (known as the "MTV Carmen"), a role she has performed more than 200 times. Recent appearances have been with Spoleto Festival USA, SIFA- Singapore Festival of the Arts, Opera Santa Barbara, Los Angeles Philharmonic and with Latino Theatre Company for 17 seasons as La Virgen in the annual pageant Diós Inatzin: La Virgen de Tepeyac.

Biography
She made her stage debut in 1982 with the Bilingual Foundation of the Arts in a touring company of Se Necesíta Costureras con Experiencia with Dame Carmen Zapata. Later that year she became a member of San Diego's Old Globe Theater's Educational Tour under Craig Noel, David McClellan and Jack O'Brien. She began her career in Musical Theatre with California regional companies (Sacramento Music Circus, Lyric Dinner Theatre, Grand Dinner Theatre) and appeared in the role of Amazon No. 2 with Yul Brynner on his final national tour and 4000th performance of The King and I, and Carousel directed by Jamie Hammerstein at the Kennedy Center. She gained entrance to opera as winner of several competitions, San Francisco Opera, Guild Opera, Fuchs, Zachary and in 1985 she entered the Metropolitan Opera Competition, and tied for first place of the Western Region with Deborah Voigt. As a national finalist, she met two important impresarios: Ian Campbell (San Diego Opera) and Francis Rizzo, (Washington Opera). In 1985 she made her operatic debut as the voice of Antonia's Mother in San Diego Opera's production of The Tales of Hoffmann starring Nelly Miricioiu, James Morris, Judith Forst and conducted by Theo Alcántara and has sung as a principal artist in nearly every season since then until her most recent performance of the Page in Salome with Lise Lindstrom. Performances in San Diego have included:
 Maddalena in Rigoletto
 Eunice in A Streetcar Named Desire
 Cornelia in Giulio Cesare
 Third Lady in The Magic Flute
 Suzuki in Madama Butterfly with Patricia Racette

Concurrently it was Frank Rizzo of Washington Opera who hired her for ten consecutive seasons with Washington Opera including a successful run as the title role in Carmen. It was there, at the Kennedy Center, that she first worked with the opera composer/director Giancarlo Menotti on his new opera Goya, broadcast live for PBS (with Plácido Domingo), which led to further collaborations including new productions of The Saint of Bleecker Street, and Amahl and the Night Visitors, for which she was nominated for a Helen Hayes Award for Outstanding Lead Actress.

In 1987 she was named an Associate Artist of the Los Angeles Opera by Peter Hemmings; her roles there include: 
 Peep Bo in The Mikado (directed by Jonathan Miller with Dudley Moore),  
 Maiden 5 in Elektra (Leonie Rysanek),
 Dorabella in Cosi Fan Tutte, 
 Isaura in Tancredi (Marilyn Horne, Henry Lewis conductor)
 La Gitana in  El Gato Montés starring Plácido Domingo, 
 Mrs. Fox in Tobias Picker's world premiere of Fantastic Mr. Fox, 
 Third Lady in the Gerald Scharfe production of Magic Flute, 
 Berta in Barber of Seville directed by John Copley with Federica Von Stade, Raul Jimenez, also with Jennifer Larrimore and John Del Carlo
 Cornelia with Giulio Cesare (with David Daniels, Bejun Mehta, Elizabeth Futral) 
 Wokle in Fanciulla del West with Catherine Malfitano as Minnie
 Mrs.Page in Falstaff with Ashley Putnum, Greg Fedderly and Stephanie Blythe
 Peter Grimes with Phillip Langridge and Nancy Gustafson, directed by the John Schlessinger,
 The Governess in Pique Dame with Plácido Domingo, Elena Obratsova, Valery Gerghiev, 
 Suzuki in Madama Butterfly with Catherine Malfitano and Yoko Watanabe, 
 Diana in Orpheus in the Underworld with Peter Mark Shifter, Dom DeLuise, Tracy Dahl, John de Main conducting, 
 Flora in La Traviata with Renee Flemming, Elizabeth Futral, and Ana Maria Martinez, directed by Marta Domingo, 
 Gertrude in Romeo et Juliette with Rolando Villazon and Anna Netrebko, 
 Charlotte The Grand Duchess of Gerolstein directed by Garry Marshall starring Federica von Stade
 La Mulata de Cordoba in Journey to Cordoba by Lee Holdridge with costume design by Gronk slso starring Danielle DeNiese
 Natasha in Les Moose, the Operatic Adventures of Rocky and Bullwinkle with Eli Villanueva written by Alan Chapman
 La Ciesca in Gianni Schicchi directed by William Freiedkin, starring Sam Ramey, Ros Elias, Jessica Rivera, Rolando Villazon,  
 Siebel in Faust with Veronica Villaroel and Sam Ramey, 
 Marcellina in Marriage of Figaro with Sir Thomas Allen, Solvieg Kringleborn, Richard Bernstein. Also with Rod Gilfry and Michael Gallup
 Frau Mary in Flying Dutchman with Greg Fedderly and directed by Julie Taymor, 
 Paula in Daniel Catán's Florencia en el Amazonas 
 Mariana in Luisa Fernanda with Placido Domingo directed by Emilio Sagi
 Annina in Der Rosenkavalier with Ashley Putnam, Federica von Stade, directed by Jonathan Miller,

She has worked with directors: John Schlesinger, William Friedkin, Francesca Zambello, Franco Zeffirelli, Sir Peter Hall, and Robert Wilson;
and with composers: Jake Heggie Dead Man Walking; Tobias Picker (Fantastic Mr. Fox), Daniel Catán (Florencia en el Amazonas), Cliff Eidelmann (Wedding in the Night Garden), Ian Krouse (Lorca, Child of the Moon), Richard Rodgers Melnick (Chinese Cabaret), and Lee Holdridge (Journey to Córdoba and Concierto para Mendez)  
She is on the  2012 roster of the [Los Angeles Music Center Education Division] and continues performing for the Los Angeles Opera Education Department. She sang as a principal soloist with Tambuco Percussion Ensemble of Mexico and the Southwest Chamber Music's CD Carlos Chavez Volume 3, which was nominated for a 2006 Best Classical CD, Best Small Ensemble and for Best Classical Latin Grammy. 2011 marked the 10th anniversary performance as the Virgen de Guadalupe in the Latino Theatre Centers annual pageant La Virgen de Tepeyac;Dios Inantzin with Sal Lopez as Juan Diego,  Geoff Rivas, Chris Franco, as Friales, Dyana Ortella as La Criada and Castulo Guerra as the Bishop.

She hosted for nine seasons (1994–2003) on the  weekly radio  broadcast L.A. Opera Notes co-hosting first with radio legend Rich Capparela and later with Los Angeles favorite, baritone Rod Gilfry Mount Wilson Productions. Later she appeared for three seasons as producer, writer and host of Sunday Evening Opera. She serves on the USC Thornton School of Music Board of Advisors, Board of UCLA's Design for Sharing, the Education Committee of Los Angeles Opera.
Her  one-woman show, Don't Be Afraid:  It's Just Opera, was created in 1984 to introduce inner city children to the world of opera. She continues those performances and has appeared in schools and community centers across the United States.

In 1985 she appeared on the Bert Convey-hosted Super Password, where she won $1,500. She also appeared on the Match Game Hollywood Squares Hour in January 1984, but did not win the Match Game segment and so did not advance.

Discography 

 Carlos Chavez Volume 3 (soloist)
 Grammy nominated (Best Classical CD, Best Classical Small Ensemble)
 Latin Grammy Nominated
 Southwest Chamber Music
 Tambuco Percussion Ensemble with Alba Quezada
 Cambria (1 CD) CD 8852
 Three Friends: Music of Ian Krouse (soloist)
 The Debussy Trio
 Ian Krouse, composer
 Marcia Dickstein, conductor
 Rubeda Canis Musica (1 CA) B000050AE1
 US Release September 4, 2001
 Florencia en el Amazonas (Paula)
 Daniel Catán, composer
 Patrick Summers, conductor with Ana Maria Martinez, Patricia Schumann, Chad Shelton…
 Houston Grand Opera Orchestra
 Albany Record (2 CD)  TROY 531/532
 US Release September 2002
 Goya (Duchess of Alba)
 Giancarlo Menotti, composer
 Steven Mercurio, conductor with Cesar Hernandez, Andrew Wentzel, Penelope Daner
 Spoleto Festival Orchestra
 ICARUS Nuova Era (2 CD) 7060/61
 Italy release April 1992
 US re release Copa d'Oro Records

Filmography/television 
60th Annual Los Angeles County Holiday Celebration - host 2019 Emmy Award Best Live Event Winner https://www.emmys.com/
 OPEN CALL Host 2012 KCET Los Angeles
 CSI: New York ("Murder Sings the Blues") (2006) Madame Butterfly
 Directed by Oz Scott
 Twilight of the Golds (1997) Brünnhilde
 Directed by Ross Kagan Marks
 Written by Jonathan Tolins
 Courage:  Profiles in Creativity (1998 documentary) Herself
 Directed by Deanna McDaniels
 Suzanna Guzmán – Native Angelena: Voice of an Angel (2002) Herself
 Associated Press Award Best Short Profile
 Producer Gay Yee
 Host Val Zavala for PBS LIFE AND TIMES
 El Gato Montes (1995) Gypsy woman
 Directed by Emilio Sagi

Sources

Breslauer, Jan, "A Perfect Fit", Los Angeles Times 5 February 1995
Crutchfield, Will, "A Mezzo-Soprano in Debut", New York Times, 4 May 1989, p. C28
McNamara, Mary, Cover Story: Almost A Diva, Los Angeles Times Magazine, 7 March 1999, p. 12
Metropolitan Opera, Performance record: Guzman, Suzanna (Mezzo Soprano) on the MetOpera Database

External links
 
Suzanne Calvin interviews Mezzo-soprano Suzanna Guzman (Dallas Opera official YouTube Channel)

American operatic mezzo-sopranos
Classical music radio presenters
Year of birth missing (living people)
Singers from Los Angeles
Living people
American television hosts
American women television presenters
Classical musicians from California
20th-century American women opera singers
21st-century American women opera singers